Boris Vladimirovich Ioganson (– 25 February 1973) also commonly known as B. V. Johanson, was a Russian and Soviet painter and educator.

Biography 
His father's Swedish ancestors Russified the surname "Johansson" into "Ioganson". 

Ioganson attended the Moscow School of Art, and studied under Kelin, Kasatkin and Malyutin. He was a member of the Society of Young Artists, where he argued for a complete transference of Russian art to Constructivism. He soon abandoned this cause and took up easel painting. In 1922, he helped found the Association of Artists of Revolutionary Russia, and abruptly transferred into the realm of Socialist Realism. Ioganson's work was inspired by that of Repin, that is exhibiting certain features of Impressionism, and was often narrative in nature. Possibly his best-known work was "Interrogation of the Communists" a piece thoroughly representative of Socialist Realism but with piercing elements of Romanticism, in addition to an exploitation of some elements of Futurism. A sense of theatricality is present in his paintings, probably due to his studies of theater design under Korovin.

He died on 25 February 1973.

Pupils 
Some graduates of Ilya Repin Leningrad Institute for Painting, Sculpture and Architecture (now known as St. Petersburg Institute for Painting, Sculpture and Architecture) studied at the Boris Ioganson Workshop (active from 1930 to 1950s) in Moscow. His notable students included Alexey Eriomin, Nikolai Baskakov, Valery Vatenin, Nina Veselova, Maya Kopitseva, Oleg Lomakin, Valentina Monakhova, Nikolai Mukho, Anatoli Nenartovich, Mikhail Natarevich, Semion Rotnitsky, Mikhail Trufanov, Yuri Tulin, Knarik Vardanyan, and Felix Lembersky.

Bibliography 
 Sergei V. Ivanov. Unknown Socialist Realism. The Leningrad School. – Saint Petersburg: NP-Print, 2007. - p. 447. , .

References 

 A History of Russian Painting, Alan Bird

1893 births
1973 deaths
20th-century Russian painters
Artists from Moscow
Russian male painters
Russian people of Swedish descent
Stalin Prize winners
Socialist realist artists
Full Members of the USSR Academy of Arts
Heroes of Socialist Labour
Soviet painters